Vladimir Mikhailovich Gorikker  (2 November 1925 – 30 December 2021) was a Russian film director and screenwriter. He died on 30 December 2021, at the age of 96.

References

External links

1925 births
2021 deaths
Russian film directors
20th-century Russian screenwriters
Male screenwriters
20th-century Russian male writers
Mass media people from Moscow
Soviet film directors
Soviet screenwriters
Russian Academy of Theatre Arts alumni
High Courses for Scriptwriters and Film Directors alumni
Academic staff of High Courses for Scriptwriters and Film Directors
Soviet people of World War II